Lost Bullet is a 2020 French action thriller film directed by Guillaume Pierret, written by Guillaume Pierret, Alban Lenoir and Kamel Guemra and starring Alban Lenoir, Nicolas Duvauchelle and Ramzy Bedia. A sequel, Lost Bullet 2, was released by Netflix on November 10, 2022 and a third film has been announced.

Technical Sheet 

 Original Title: Balle Perdue
 English Title: Lost Bullet
 Directed by: Guillaume Pierret
 Screenplay: Guillaume Pierret
 Adaptation and dialogues: Guillaume Pierret, Alban Lenoir and Kamel Guemra
 Music: André Dziezuk
 Photography: Morgan S. Dalibert
 Editing: Sophie Fourdrinoy
 Sound: Julien Riquier, Roland Voglaire, Luc Thomas
 Design: Nicolas Flipo
 Costumes: Veronique Gely
 Makeup: Chloe Van Lierde
 Artistic collaboration: Alban Lenoir
 Producer: Rémi Leautier
 Production Company: Inoxy Films, Versus Production, Nolita TV
 Distributed by: Netflix
 Country: France
 Language: français
 Format: color
 Genre: Action, Crime
 Running Time: 93 minutes
 Release date :
 Worldwide: June 19, 2020 (on Netflix)

Plot
Lino is a thief, ex-con and getaway driver who engineers cars for crime in southern France. Caught in an armoured Renault Clio which he drove through four walls trying to rob a store, he is imprisoned. He is put on day release by French police detective Charas (Ramzy Bedia) to work for the drug squad, engineering police cars to be able to catch drug runners at speed by ramming vehicles. Eventually Charas gets him a pardon and a garage to work in. 
The pace of the film suddenly changes when crooked cop Areski (Nicolas Duvauchelle) kills Charas, for reasons that are not entirely clear but emerge later - Areski's 'brigade' wants to skim off more money from the drug runners and Charas, suspicious of him, was out to shut them down. Areski frames Lino for the murder, being his sole interrogator in the police station and heading suspicion away from himself. Lino escapes the police station, where Areski left his cell door open (!) by fighting ten officers. We then learn that Charas's early 1990s Renault 21 2l turbo model was not destroyed as evidence, but hidden (?) by a drug runner employee, who turns out to be Lino's brother or adopted brother Quentin (Rod Paradot). The car contains the bullet Chara was shot with, which could be traced back to  Areski's weapon as key evidence. 
A fellow officer Julia (Stéfi Celma) believes him, and we learn they are now, or once were, lovers (unclear). Areski tries to murder all witnesses to his own crime - Quentin, and various villains in a bloodbath, sparing his partner in crime Marco, who Lino beats up and handcuffs. Finally, Lino gets a night alone in a garage, equips the red Renault turbo with bullbars and rams, and takes on the corrupt police brigade, skewering a vehicle from behind on the highway and escaping after sending it flying. He fights Areski, manages to arrive at the police compound with the car aflame, and we cut to the bullet being extracted for forensics - and the game's up for Areski. Areski packs money in a bag and goes on the run, leaving his wife and daughter. Lino is severely injured but free of suspicion, and comforted by Julia.

The sequel, Lost Bullet 2 picks up from the same plot line, set 6 months later.

Cast 
 Alban Lenoir as Lino
 Nicolas Duvauchelle as Areski
 Ramzy Bedia as Charas
 Stéfi Celma as Julia
 Rod Paradot as Quentin
 Sébastien Lalanne as Marco
 Arthur Aspaturian as Kad
 Patrick Médioni as Jacques
 Alexandre Philip as Jeff
 Stephen Scardicchio as Policier BAC
 Damien Leconte as Policier Commissariat
 Thibaut Evrard as Lieutenant Bruno
 Anne Serra as Femme Areski
 Lino Lenoir as Enfant Areski
 Pascale Arbillot as Moss

Release
Lost Bullet was released on June 19, 2020. It was entirely filmed in the Mediterranean port city of Sète, Languedoc, France.

Critical reception
The film received a mixed reaction from some critics, who variously noted its wooden characters and poor dialogue. Although the action sequences was praised. Rodney Twelftree notes a single photo of the car could have exposed the true villain.

On Rotten Tomatoes it has an approval rating of 78% based on 9 reviews.

References

External links
 
 

2020 films
2020s French-language films
2020 action thriller films
French-language Netflix original films
French action thriller films
2020s French films